Vrskmaň is a municipality and village in Chomutov District in the Ústí nad Labem Region of the Czech Republic. It has about 300 inhabitants.

Administrative parts
The village of Zaječice is an administrative part of Vrskmaň.

References

Villages in Chomutov District